Boys is the seventh studio album by Canadian country artist Dean Brody. It was released on November 18, 2020 through his independent label Scurvy Dog Music.

Singles
"Can't Help Myself" was released as the debut single in February 2020. The song is a collaboration with Canadian country duo the Reklaws, and peaked at #1 on the Billboard Canada Country chart. It set a record for the most-spun song in a single week on Canadian country radio with 1782 spins. It peaked at #49 on the Canadian Hot 100.

"Canadian Summer" was released as the second single to radio in June 2020. It peaked at #1 on the Canada Country chart, and set the new record as the most-spun song in a single-week on Canadian country radio with 1817 spins. It also reached a peak of #56 on the Canadian Hot 100.

"Boys" was released as the third single from the album in November 2020, and features American country singer Mickey Guyton. It peaked at #1 on Canadian country radio for the week of April 3, 2021, and also peaked at #65 on the Canadian Hot 100 that week.

"Lightning Bug" was released to country radio as the fourth single from the album on April 28, 2021, and later peaked at number seven on Canada Country and number 78 on the Canadian Hot 100.

"I'd Go to Jail" was released as the fifth single from the album in October 2021. It peaked at number five on the Canada Country chart and number 73 on the Canadian Hot 100.

Track listing

Charts

Singles

Promotional singles

Awards and nominations

References

2020 albums
Dean Brody albums
Albums produced by Todd Clark